Akaryocytes, also known as akaryotes or acaryotes, are cells without a nucleus. The most common type of akaryocytes are viruses. The name is derived from the Greek prefix "a-", meaning "without" and the Greek "karyo-", meaning "nut" or "kernel". Akaryocytes also include viruses since they lack a nucleus and cytoplasm but have instead, a central core of RNA or DNA. Akaryocytes are not part of the seven main ranks of taxa. Red blood cells are also classified as akaryocytes because they lack a cell nucleus after they have developed.

Cells